"Champions" is a song by American rappers Kanye West, Gucci Mane, Big Sean, 2 Chainz, Travis Scott, Yo Gotti, Quavo, and Desiigner. It was originally intended to be released as the lead single from the scrapped GOOD Music compilation album Cruel Winter. The song was produced by West alongside Low Pros and Mike Dean, with co-production from Derek Watkins and Charlie Heat, and additional production from Noah Goldstein. A freestyle video was released by Teyana Taylor in September 2016.

Release 
"Champions" was first aired on Big Boy's 92.3. Kanye West later released the song as the first single from Cruel Winter. The single was untitled at the time, with "Round and Round" and "Champions" being used as working titles. It was officially released to iTunes on June 12, 2016.

Critical reception 
The song was placed at number 49 on Complex's list of 2016's best songs.

Chart performance 
On the chart dated July 2, 2016, "Champions" entered the US Billboard Hot 100 at number 71, powered by first-week digital download sales of 31,000 copies and it debuted at number 7 on the US Hot R&B/Hip-Hop Singles Sales chart. On May 15, 2018, the song was certified platinum by the Recording Industry Association of America (RIAA) for selling over one million digital copies in the United States.

Freestyle video 
Teyana Taylor released a video of her freestyling over the track on September 6, 2016. The video is a stop-motion clip that sees Taylor covered in smeared gold paint and dancing militaristically in front of a gray backdrop. It marked Taylor's first video since she starred in the music video for West's single "Fade".

Personnel 
Credits adapted from Tidal.

 Kanye West – vocals, production
 Gucci Mane – vocals
 Big Sean – vocals
 2 Chainz – vocals
 Travis Scott – vocals
 Yo Gotti – vocals
 Quavo – vocals, recording engineer
 Desiigner – vocals
 A-Trak – production
 Lex Luger – production
 Mike Dean – production, bass guitar, keyboards, drum programming, recording engineer, mixing
 Fonzworth Bentley – co-production
 Charlie Heat – co-production
 Noah Goldstein – additional production, recording engineer
 Finis "KY" White – recording engineer
 Maximilian Jaeger – recording engineer
 Gregg Rominiecki – recording engineer
 Thomas Goff – recording engineer
 William J. Sullivan – assistant recording engineer
 Kez Khou – mix assistance

Charts

Certifications

References

External links
Lyrics of the song at Genius

2016 singles
2016 songs
2 Chainz songs
Big Sean songs
Def Jam Recordings singles
Desiigner songs
GOOD Music singles
Gucci Mane songs
Kanye West songs
Posse cuts
Quavo songs
Song recordings produced by Charlie Heat
Song recordings produced by Kanye West
Song recordings produced by Lex Luger (musician)
Song recordings produced by Mike Dean (record producer)
Songs written by 2 Chainz
Songs written by Big Sean
Songs written by Fonzworth Bentley
Songs written by Gucci Mane
Songs written by Kanye West
Songs written by Lex Luger (musician)
Songs written by Mike Dean (record producer)
Songs written by Quavo
Songs written by Travis Scott
Songs written by Yo Gotti
Travis Scott songs
Yo Gotti songs